Richard Karelson (born 1 August 1977) is an Estonian wrestler.

He was born in Tapa. In 2009 he graduated from Estonian Military Academy.

He began his wrestling career in 1985. He is participated on World Wrestling Championships, best place 11th (2002). He is 11-times Estonian champion.

His son Richard is also a wrestler.

References

Living people
1977 births
Estonian male sport wrestlers
People from Tapa, Estonia